Play most commonly refers to: 
 Play (activity), an activity done for enjoyment
 Play (theatre), a work of drama

Play may refer also to:

Computers and technology
 Google Play, a digital content service
 Play Framework, a Java framework
 Play Mobile, a Polish internet provider
 Xperia Play, an Android phone
 Rakuten.co.uk (formerly Play.com), an online retailer
 Backlash (engineering), or play, non-reversible part of movement
 Petroleum play, oil fields with same geological circumstances
 Play symbol, in media control devices

Film
 Play (2005 film), Chilean film directed by Alicia Scherson
 Play, a 2009 short film directed by David Kaplan
 Play (2011 film), a Swedish film directed by Ruben Östlund
 Rush (2012 film), an Indian film earlier titled Play and also known as Raftaar 24 x 7
 The Play (film), a 2013 Bengali film

Literature and publications
 Play (play), written by Samuel Beckett
 Play (The New York Times), a sports magazine
 Play (UK magazine), a UK PlayStation magazine
 Play (US magazine), a US video game magazine
 Play (PRC magazine), PC gaming magazine, China

Music

Classical music
 Play (composition), a 2013 symphony by Andrew Norman
 Play! A Video Game Symphony

Artists and bands
 Christopher "Play" Martin
 Play (Swedish group)
 Play (Mexican band)

Albums
 Play (Akdong Musician album), 2014
 Play (Bond album)
 Play (Brad Paisley album)
 Play (Chick Corea and Bobby McFerrin album), 1992
 Play (David Ball album)
 Play (Doug E. Fresh album)
 Play (Great Big Sea album), 1997
 Play (Joanna MacGregor album), 2002
 Play (Jolin Tsai album), 2014
 Play (Magazine album), 1980
 Play (Masaki Suda album), 2018
 Play (Mike Stern album), 1999
 Play (Moby album), 1999
 Play (Namie Amuro album), 2007
 Play (Peter Gabriel video album)
 Play (Play album), by the Swedish group
 Play (S.H.E album)
 Play (Squeeze album), 1991
 Play (Super Junior album), 2017
 Play (Ride EP), 1990
 Play (Ricky Martin EP), 2022
 Play (Dave Grohl EP), 2018
 Play (The Surfaris album), by The Surfaris, 1963
 Play, by Pedro Suárez-Vértiz, 2004
 Plays, by Andy Dixon
 Plays, by Ekkehard Ehlers, 2002

Songs
 "Play" (Chungha song), 2020
 "Play" (David Banner song), 2005
 "Play" (Jax Jones and Years & Years song), 2018
 "Play" (Jennifer Lopez song), 2001
 "Play" (Jessie J song), 2018
 "Play" (Jüri Pootsmann song), 2016
 "Play" (K-391, Alan Walker and Martin Tungevaag song), 2019
 "Play" (Robyn song), 1999
 "Play" (Yuju song), 2022
 "Play", by Band-Maid from World Domination
 "Play", by Jolin Tsai from Play
 "Play", by Sekai No Owari from Tree
 "Play", by Taio Cruz from TY.O
 "Play", by SS501
 "Play", by Todrick Hall featuring Jade Novah from Forbidden
 The Play, suite from Elvis Costello composition Il Sogno

Awards

 PLAY - Prémios da Música Portuguesa

Games and sports
 Gameplay
 Play from scrimmage in American and Canadian football
 The Play (American football), a famous last-second kickoff return by the California Golden Bears to beat the Stanford Cardinal in 1982

Television
 Play (TV series), a Canadian news magazine series
 Play UK, a defunct UKTV channel
 Television play
The Play, 2011 episode of the TV series The Middle
The Play, 1993 episode of the TV series Matlock
The Play, 1968 episode of the TV series Mission: Impossible
The Play, 1986 episode of the TV series Mr. Belvedere
The Play, 2005 episode of the TV series Zoey 101

Video games
 Play, The Videogames World, European exhibition
 Wii Play, a 2006 video game

Other uses
 Play (airline), an Icelandic airline
 Play (Jonker), a 2002 sculpture
 Play (BDSM), "kinky" activities
 Play! Pavilion, a planned Epcot pavilion
 Play 99.6 (radio), Jordan
 Dave & Buster's, NYSE symbol
 Word play

See also
 Player (disambiguation)